The 16th Street Mall is a pedestrian and transit mall in Denver, Colorado. The mall, 1.25 miles (2 kilometers) long, runs along 16th Street in downtown Denver, from Wewatta Street (at Union Station) to the intersection of 16th Avenue and Broadway (at Civic Center Station). The intricate granite stone sidewalks and streets were designed by architect I.M Pei to resemble the scale pattern of the western diamondback rattlesnake. It is home to over 300 stores, 50 restaurants, and the Denver Pavilions shopping mall.

History

Before the mall was built, downtown Denver experienced rates of bus congestion, especially on 16th and 17th streets, where more than 600 bus trips per day operated in 1970s, creating both air pollution and traffic congestion. The design of the area also discouraged pedestrian activity. The solution proposed by the downtown Denver business community and the Regional Transportation District (RTD) was to build two bus transfer stations at either end of 16th Street and connect the two with a pedestrian mall that would include a free transit shuttle bus service. The final design was drawn up by noted architecture firm I. M. Pei & Partners, in collaboration with the urban design and landscape architecture firm, OLIN. Construction was funded by a $75 million grant from Federal Interstate Highway Transfer Funds and the Federal Urban Mass Transit Administration, with RTD providing a local match.

It took crews two years to install trees, lights, and granite pavers along the mall. The mall opened on October 4, 1982, and over 200,000 people attended the opening day ceremonies. The mall initially stretched between Market Street (the site of the Market Street Station) and Broadway (the site of Civic Center Station). Light rail service was added on California and Stout in 1994, creating a third transit hub along the mall.

To enable the project, the 16th Street Mall was extended from Market Street to Wynkoop Street in 2001, and to Union Station in 2002 to coincide with the completion of the new light rail spur to the station. In May 2014, RTD opened a new underground bus concourse at Union Station, and Market Street Station was closed. The land was sold to a developer for $11 million, which helped fund the redevelopment of Union Station, and the station site was transformed into a mixed-use building with residential, office, retail and restaurant space.

MallRide

A free shuttle bus service, operated by the Regional Transportation District (RTD), known as the MallRide, operates along the length of the mall, and continues north on 16th Street to Denver Union Station. Buses stop at every intersection along the route.

The service was introduced when the mall opened in 1982. It originally traveled between Market Street Station and Civic Center Station (16th & Broadway), two hubs for RTD buses at either end of downtown. Light rail service was added at 16th & California and 16th & Stout stations in 1994, creating a third transit hub along the mall. In May 2014, Market Street Station was closed and replaced with the Union Station Transit Center.

Today, the route continues to provide a connection between the A Line, B Line, C Line, E Line, W Line and the underground bus concourse at Union Station; the D Line, F Line, H Line, and L Line at 16th & California and 16th & Stout stations; and the bus concourse at Civic Center Station. RTD estimates the MallRide shuttle removes nearly a thousand daily bus trips from the streets of downtown Denver, reducing traffic congestion and improving air quality.

As part of the Union Station Transit Center opening, RTD introduced the MetroRide service with operates parallel to the MallRide on 18th and 19th Streets, but operates much faster by making far fewer stops between Union Station and Civic Center Station.

The MallRide has always used a fleet of right-hand-drive buses that were custom-designed and purpose-built. The first-generation buses which were used until 1999 were diesel-powered and front-wheel drive. The second-generation "EcoMark" buses were introduced in 1999 and were series hybrids with batteries charged by a  1.6-litre compressed natural gas Ford engine. The third-generation "BYD K10MR" buses were introduced in 2016 and are battery electric.

Impact as an urban space

The Project for Public Spaces says of the Mall that it "provides the entire downtown with shuttle bus circulation and high quality pedestrian access to Union Station. However, its success as a place has to do with its edge uses, over 300 shops and 50 restaurants that line the Mall with cafés, window displays, and buskers."

In summer 2014, and again in 2015, the Downtown Denver Partnership and Downtown Denver Business Improvement collaborated on several Meet in the Street Sunday events, rerouting the Mall Shuttle to adjacent streets and opening much of the mall to pedestrians and cyclists, and featuring various fun activities to bring people together.

References

External links

The Downtown Denver Partnership website on the 16th Street Mall
16th Street Mall Plan for the mall's next 25 years
Rocky Mountain News: Don't realign city's spine, panel says, May 30, 2008
Regional Transportation District webpage, provides Mall Shuttle information including frequency by time of day.
16th street mall an entertaining place
SAH Archipedia Building Entry
16th Street Transitway Mall

Tourist attractions in Denver
Regional Transportation District
Transportation in Denver
Streets in Colorado
Pedestrian malls in the United States
Shopping malls in Colorado
Shopping malls established in 1982
Buildings and structures in Denver
1982 establishments in Colorado